is a railway station on the Taita Line in the city of Kani, Gifu Prefecture, Japan, operated by Central Japan Railway Company (JR Tōkai).

Lines

Station layout
Kani Station has two opposed ground-level side platforms connected to the station building by a footbridge. The station has a Midori no Madoguchi staffed ticket office.

Platforms

Adjacent stations

|-
!colspan=5|JR Central

History
Kani Station opened on December 28, 1918 as   station on the Tōnō Railway. It was renamed to its present name on April 1, 1982. The station was absorbed into the JR Tōkai network upon the privatization of the Japanese National Railways (JNR) on April 1, 1987.

Passenger statistics
In fiscal 2016, the station was used by an average of 1,485 passengers daily (boarding passengers only).

Surrounding area
 Kani City Hall
 Kani Post Office

See also
 List of Railway Stations in Japan

References

External links

Railway stations in Gifu Prefecture
Taita Line
Railway stations in Japan opened in 1918
Stations of Central Japan Railway Company
Kani, Gifu